Shane Curran (born 8 April 1971) is an Irish sportsperson from Castlerea, County Roscommon. He is the former inter-county Gaelic football goalkeeper for Roscommon, and his club St Brigid's. He played association football as well with Athlone Town FC.

Curran holds the record of being the only goalkeeper to score both a goal and a point in championship football, his 1-1 versus Sligo in the Connacht championship led to him receiving the Irish Independent "May player of the Month" in 2004. Curran followed in his father's footsteps in 2012 by winning a Connacht club senior medal, becoming the fourth father-and-son to hold such medals. His career spanned four decades, with performances at minor, senior and club levels in 1989, 1990, 2003, 2004 and 2013. He also captained the Roscommon Junior Team to All Ireland success in 2000.

Curran was featured in an episode of TG4's Laochra Gael documentary series in January 2021.

Sports

Football

With Roscommon, he won a Connacht Minor Football Championship medal in 1989. He made his senior championship debut with Roscommon as a forward in 1991, however he picked up an injury early on in the game. He lined out in the 1992 Connacht Senior Football Championship but couldn't help his side from a heavy loss to Mayo. He drifted away from intercounty football for the next few seasons after the loss but played in both the 1994 and 1997 championships.

He returned to the senior set-up in 2001 making his first championship appearance in four years in the Connacht Senior Football Championship opening round game against New York. He was sent off during the game and failed to regain the starting spot as Roscommon won a first Connacht title since 1991.

In 2003, he was made captain of the side by new manager Tommy Carr. Roscommon lost out to Galway in Connacht but went on a good run in the qualifiers. Wins over Cork, Leitrim and two games needing extra time against Offaly and Kildare saw Roscommon qualify for an All-Ireland quarter-final with Kerry. It was Roscommon's first game in Croke Park since 1991, and despite scoring three goals they came up short on a 1-21 to 3-10 scoreline. 

Curran was also the goalkeeper with Athlone Town FC in the League of Ireland. He retired from association football in 1997 to devote his sporting time to Gaelic football.

Business
Since retiring from inter-county football, Curran has set up a number of businesses as part of his STC group portfolio.

He was commissioned by the GAA games department, under Pat Daly, to contribute to the development of a kicking tee for use in Gaelic football. His design became the one most goalkeepers went on to use. Curran was "involved in producing the Puntee", for use by goalkeeper in kick-outs, as a means of "reducing goalkeeping injuries".

Curran co-founded a flood defence company, Global Flood Solutions, in 2009. This company has entered into several contracts internationally.

Politics
Curran stood unsuccessfully in the 2016 general election as a Fianna Fáil candidate in the Roscommon–Galway constituency. He received approximately two thousand first presence votes (4%), and was eliminated on the seventh count.

Honours

Gaelic football
St Brigid's (club)
All-Ireland Senior Club Football Championship (1): 2013
Connacht Senior Club Football Championship (2): 2011,2012
Roscommon Senior Football Championship (6): 2005, 2007, 2011, 2012, 2013, 2014.

Roscommon (inter-county)
Connacht Senior Football Championship (1): 2001
Connacht Minor Football Championship (1): 1989
All ireland Junior Championship Captain winners (1) : 2000 

Individual
All Star nominee: 2003
GPA Player of the Month (1): May 2004
Roscommon Senior Player of the Year (1): 2003
Captained Roscommon: 2003–2004
Holds Championship record for being the only goalkeeper in GAA history to score 1 goal and 1 point in a championship match and finish top scorer.

Soccer
Athlone Town Player of the Year (1): 1995
Leinster Senior league Medal (1): 1995

References

1971 births
Living people
Athlone Town A.F.C. players
Association football goalkeepers
Castlerea St Kevin's Gaelic footballers
Connacht inter-provincial Gaelic footballers
Fianna Fáil politicians
Gaelic footballers who switched code
Gaelic football goalkeepers
Gaelic football managers
Irish sportsperson-politicians
League of Ireland players
Roscommon inter-county Gaelic footballers
St Brigid's (Roscommon) Gaelic footballers
Republic of Ireland association footballers